Jamie Brown is the name of:

Jamie Brown (baseball) (born 1977), relief pitcher
Jamie Brown (American football) (born 1972), former American football offensive tackle
Jamie Brown (cricketer), New Zealand cricketer
Jamie Allan Brown (born 1987), Scottish activist and campaigner
Jamie Foster Brown (born 1946), owner and publisher of Sister 2 Sister magazine
Jamie Brown (producer, born 1945), American producer and screenwriter, known from Toby McTeague or Kevin of the North
Jamie Brown (producer, born 1966), American producer and screenwriter, known from Lucid
Jamie Brown (composer) (born 1980), British classical composer
Jamie Brown (musician), better known by his alias Pick Z. Stix with the band White Flag
Jamie Brown (rally driver), on the List of European Rally Championship drivers

See also
James Brown (disambiguation)